{{DISPLAYTITLE:C17H15O7}}

The chemical formula C17H15O7 (or C17H15O7+, molar mass : 331.2968  g/mol, exact mass :331.081778) may refer to :
 Europinidin, an anthocyanidin
 Malvidin, an anthocyanidin